The following is a list of awards and nominations received by Mumford & Sons. Mumford and Sons is a folk rock band from Britain. They consist of four members, Marcus Mumford, Ben Lovett, Winston Marshall, and Ted Dwayne. They formed in 2007 in London and since then  their discography has been nominated for  multiple awards.

American Music Award
The American Music Award is an annual American music awards show, created by Dick Clark in 1973 for ABC when the network's contract to present the Grammy Award expired.

|-
| 2011
| rowspan="2" | Mumford & Sons
| rowspan="2" | Favorite Alternative Artist
| 
|-
| 2013
| 
|-
|}

Americana Music Honors & Awards
The Americana Music Honors & Awards is the marquee event for the Americana Music Association.

|-
| colspan="4" align="center" | United States
|-
| rowspan="2"| 2011
| rowspan="2"| Mumford & Sons
| Emerging Artist of the Year
| 
|-
| Duo/Group of the Year
| 
|-
| colspan="4" align="center" | United Kingdom
|-
| 2018
| Mumford & Sons
| Trailblazer Award
| 
|}

ARIA Music Awards
The ARIA Music Awards (Australian Recording Industry Association Music Awards) is an annual series of awards nights celebrating the Music of Australia industry, put on by the Australian Recording Industry Association.

! Lost to
|-
| 2010
| Mumford & Sons
| Most Popular International Artist
| 
| 
|-
| 2013
| Babel
| Best International Artist 
|  
| One Direction - Take Me Home
|}

Billboard Music Award
The Billboard Music Award is an honor given by Billboard, a publication and Billboard charts covering the music business.

|-
| rowspan="7"| 2011
|rowspan="2"| Mumford & Sons
| Top Rock Artist
| 
|-
| Top Alternative Artist
| 
|-
| rowspan="2"| Sigh No More
| Top Rock Album
| 
|-
| Top Alternative Album
| 
|-
| rowspan="2"| "Little Lion Man"
| Top Rock Song
| 
|-
| rowspan="2"| Top Alternative Song
| 
|-
| "The Cave"
| 
|-
| rowspan="5" | 2012
| rowspan="2" | Mumford & Sons
| Top Rock Artist
| 
|-
| Top Alternative Artist
| 
|-
| rowspan="2" | Sigh No More
| Top Rock Album
| 
|-
| Top Alternative Album
| 
|-
| "The Cave"
| Top Alternative Song
| 
|-
| rowspan="4" | 2013
| rowspan="2" | Mumford & Sons
| Top Billboard 200 Artist
| 
|-
| Top Duo/Group
| 
|-
| rowspan="3" | Babel
| Top Billboard 200 Album
| 
|-
| rowspan="4" | Top Rock Album
| 
|-
| 2014
| 
|-
| 2016
| Wilder Mind
| 
|-
| 2019
| Delta
| 
|}

Brit Awards
The Brit Awards are the British Phonographic Industry's annual pop music awards.

|-
|rowspan="3"|2011
| rowspan="2"| Mumford & Sons
| British Group
| 
|-
| British Breakthrough Act
| 
|-
| Sigh No More
| British Album of the Year
| 
|-
|rowspan="3"|2013
| rowspan="2"| Mumford & Sons
| British Group
| 
|-
| British Live Act
| 
|-
| Babel
| British Album of the Year
| 
|}

Echo Music Prize
The Echo Music Prize is an accolade by the Deutsche Phono-Akademie an association of recording companies of Germany to recognize outstanding achievement in the music industry.

|-
| 2013
| Mumford & Sons
| International Rock/Pop Group
| 
|}

European Festivals Awards
The European Festivals Awards were initiated in 2010 by the European festival association Yourope and the festival website Virtual Festivals Europe.

|-
| rowspan="2" | 2012
| Mumford & Sons
| Headliner of the Year || 
|-
| "Little Lion Man"
| Anthem of the Year || 
|}

GAFFA Awards

Sweden GAFFA Awards
Delivered since 2010, the GAFFA Awards (Swedish: GAFFA Priset) are a Swedish award that rewards popular music awarded by the magazine of the same name.

!
|-
|rowspan="2"| 2012
| Babel
| Best Foreign Album
| 
| style="text-align:center;" rowspan="2"|
|-
|rowspan="3"| Mumford & Sons
|rowspan="3"| Best Foreign Band
| 
|-
| 2015
| 
| style="text-align:center;" |
|-
| 2019
| 
| style="text-align:center;" |
|-
|}

Grammy Awards
A Grammy Award is an honor awarded by the National Academy of Recording Arts and Sciences of the United States to recognize outstanding achievement in the mainly English-language music industry.

|-
|rowspan="2"|2011
| Mumford & Sons
| Best New Artist
| 
|-
| "Little Lion Man"
| Best Rock Song
| 
|-
|rowspan="4"|2012
| rowspan="4"|"The Cave"
| Record of the Year
| 
|-
| Song of the Year
| 
|-
| Best Rock Performance
| 
|-
|Best Rock Song
| 
|-
|rowspan="6"|2013
| rowspan="2"|Babel
| Album of the Year
| 
|-
|Best Americana Album
| 
|-
|rowspan="2"|"I Will Wait"
| Best Rock Performance
|
|-
|Best Rock Song
| 
|-
|"Learn Me Right" (with Birdy)
| Best Song Written for Visual Media
| 
|-
|Big Easy Express
| rowspan="2"| Best Music Film
| 
|-
|2014
| The Road To Red Rocks
| 
|-
|}

Ivor Novello Awards
The Ivor Novello Awards, named after the Cardiff-born entertainer Ivor Novello, are awards for songwriter and composer.

|-
| 2014
| Mumford & Sons
| International Achievement
| 
|}

Juno Award
The Juno Award are presented annually to Canadian musical artists and bands to acknowledge their artistic and technical achievements in all aspects of music.

|-
| 2013
| Babel
| International Album of the Year
| 
|}

Live UK Music Business Awards

|-
| 2010
| rowspan="3"|Mumford & Sons
| Breakthrough Artiste
| 
|-
| 2013
| rowspan="2" | Best Festival Performance
| 
|-
| 2015
| 
|}

Mercury Prize
The Mercury Prize is an annual music prize awarded for the best album from the United Kingdom and Ireland.

|-
| 2010
| Sigh No More
| Album of the Year
| 
|}

MOJO Awards
The Mojo Awards was an awards ceremony that began in 2004 and ended in 2009 by Mojo, a popular music magazine published monthly by Bauer in the United Kingdom.

|-
| 2010
| Mumford & Sons
| Breakthrough Act
| 
|}

MTV Video Music Award
An MTV Video Music Award is an award presented by the cable channel MTV to honor the best in the music video medium.

|-
| 2010
| "Little Lion Man"
| Best Cinematography
| 
|-
| 2011
| "The Cave"
| rowspan="2" | Best Rock Video
| 
|-
| 2013
| "I Will Wait"
| 
|}

NME Awards
The NME Awards is an annual Popular music awards show in the United Kingdom, founded by the music magazine, NME.

|-
| 2010
| Mumford & Sons
| Best New Band
| 
|}

People's Choice Awards
The People's Choice Awards is an American awards show, recognizing the people and the work of popular culture, voted on by the Public.

|-
| 2014
| Mumford & Sons
| Favourite Alternative/Rock Band
| 
|}

Q Awards
The Q Awards are the UK's annual music awards run by the music magazine Q.

|-
| rowspan="2"|2010
| Mumford & Sons
| Best New Act
| 
|-
| "The Cave"
| Best Track
| 
|-
| 2013
| rowspan="2" | Mumford & Sons
| rowspan="2" | Best Live Act
| 
|-
| 2015
| 
|}

Silver Clef Award
The Silver Clef Award is an annual United Kingdom Popular music awards lunch which has been running since 1976.

|-
| 2013
| Mumford & Sons
| Best Live Act
| 
|}

Teen Choice Awards
The Teen Choice Awards is an annual awards show that airs on the Fox television network.

|-
| 2013
| Mumford & Sons
| Choice Rock Group
| 
|}

UK Festival Awards
The UK Festival Awards are awarded annually, with various categories for all aspects of festivals that have taken place in the United Kingdom, and one category for European festivals.

|-
| rowspan="4" | 2010
| rowspan="3" | Mumford & Sons
| VF Critics' Choice
| 
|-
| Breakthrough Artist
| 
|-
| Headline Performance
| 
|-
| "The Cave"
| Anthem of the Year
| 
|}

UK Music Video Awards
The UK Music Video Awards is an annual celebration of creativity, technical excellence and innovation in music video and moving image for music.

|-
| 2013
| The Road to Red Rocks
| rowspan="2" | Best Live Music Coverage
| 
|-
| 2015
| The Hospital Live Sessions
| 
|}

References

Mumford and Sons